The Bukidnon–Cotabato Road is a 94-kilometre (58 mi) two-to-four lane highway that connects the provinces of North Cotabato and Bukidnon. This highway serves as one of the components of Sayre Highway.

This highway is a designated component of National Route 943 (N943) of the Philippine highway network.

References 

Roads in Bukidnon
Roads in Cotabato